The Badavara Shramikara Raithara (BSR) Congress was a political party based in Karnataka state. It was founded in 2011 by B. Sriramulu, a former minister in the Karnataka State Government. In the 2013 Karnataka Legislative Assembly elections, the party won 4 out of the 150 seats it had contested and secured about 2.7% of the total votes cast.

However, prior to the Lok Sabha elections in 2014, the party's founding leader B. Sriramulu rejoined the BJP.

References 

Bharatiya Janata Party breakaway groups
Political parties in Karnataka
Defunct communist parties in India
2011 establishments in Karnataka
Political parties established in 2011
Year of disestablishment missing